The Southern Hockey League was a low-level minor professional ice hockey league that operated from 1973 to 1977. The league was formed when the Eastern Hockey League split in two; the southern teams became the Southern Hockey League, and the northern teams became the North American Hockey League. It was the first professional hockey league to operate wholly within the Southern United States, and followed the establishment of the Atlanta Flames in the National Hockey League; and also the Richmond Robins and the Tidewater Wings in the American Hockey League. The Southern Hockey League was a feeder league for the recently started World Hockey Association. Tedd Munchak was appointed the league's first commissioner, and was owner of the Greensboro Generals. The championship trophy of the league was named the James Crockett Cup, after local figure Jim Crockett Sr. The league disbanded during its fourth season, when four of its seven teams folded due to financial issues.

History
In May 1973, the four teams in the Eastern Hockey League (EHL)'s Southern Division–the Charlotte Checkers, Greensboro Generals, Roanoke Valley Rebels, and Suncoast Suns–all left the EHL to form the Southern Hockey League. For some time, the EHL's southern teams had felt chagrin at the costs of traveling to northern arenas, and other regulations such as dressing only 14 players for games. The four charter members were joined by two expansion teams, the Macon Whoopees and Winston-Salem Polar Twins. The SHL established itself as a fully professional league; the EHL was nominally an amateur league, but players were known to be paid for playing. It became a development league for the year-old World Hockey Association (WHA). The affiliation with the WHA brought the promise of better players, but drawbacks included not finalizing rosters until just before the season started, and mid-season callups straining the talent pool.

Six teams began the 1973–74 Southern Hockey League season, but two did not complete the schedule due to financial trouble. The Suncoast Suns folded on December 19, 1973. The Macon Whoopees forfeited a game against Charlotte on January 17, 1974, when players refused to play because of not being paid. The team eventually folded on February 15, 1974. The remaining four teams made the playoffs, with the Roanoke Valley Rebels finishing as champions. On July 31, 1975, Jack Riley was announced as the new commissioner of the SHL, taking over for interim leader Gene Hawthorne, of the Roanoke Valley Rebels.

The four existing teams returned for the 1974–75 Southern Hockey League season, joined by a fifth expansion team from Fayetteville, North Carolina. The new team was named after the Fayetteville Arsenal, and was scheduled to play at the Cumberland County Memorial Arena. In October 1974, owner Bill Raue moved the team, to Hampton, Virginia, before playing any games, when availability of home ice dates became a problem. The new Hampton Gulls relocated to the Hampton Coliseum, recently vacated by the Virginia Wings of the American Hockey League. The five teams played a complete schedule of 72 games, with the Charlotte Checkers winning both the regular season and playoff titles.

The five existing teams returned for the 1975–76 Southern Hockey League season, joined by a sixth expansion team from Norfolk, Virginia. The Tidewater Sharks joined the league owned by Virginia politician Dick Davis, playing at the Norfolk Scope. The six teams played a complete schedule of 72 games, with the Charlotte Checkers repeating as regular season and playoff champions.

The Roanoke Valley Rebels ceased operations, and two new teams were added for the 1976–77 Southern Hockey League season. The Baltimore Clippers transferred from the American Hockey League, and the Richmond Wildcats were an expansion team. Both Richmond and Greensboro folded on January 3, 1977, due to financial problems. On January 7, the Tidewater Sharks folded after missing payroll, and Winston-Salem owner Jim Crockett Jr. pulled the Polar Twins out of the league. The remaining three teams considered adding a fourth team, but the league was short on funds when Greensboro and Winstom-Salem defaulted on $25,000 loans. The league also considered playing a round-robin tournament to determine a champion, or develop an interlocking schedule with either the North American Hockey League or the International Hockey League. On January 22, 1977, both the NAHL and IHL rejected the proposal. The league played what would be its last game on January 31, 1977. It planned to return for the 1977–78 season, but these plans came to nothing.

Teams

The Southern Hockey League started with teams in Virginia, North Carolina and Florida. Winston-Salem was added next, owned by a group of 15 investors. The league sought out a sixth team in southern states to fill in the gap between North Carolina and Florida. Westward expansion was ruled out, as Tennessee teams were already in the Central Professional Hockey League, and hockey in Louisville, Kentucky, ended in 1960. South Carolina did not have a suitable facility, nor did it get a professional hockey team until 1993. Alabama also did not have a suitable arena, and hockey first arrived there with the Birmingham Bulls in 1976. This left Georgia, and the city of Macon being targeted because it had a suitable arena that was adjacent to Interstate 75; and Macon previously had hockey a temporary hockey team in 1968. The SHL also hoped to build upon the Atlanta Flames arriving in 1972. Commissioner Tedd Munchak, wanted a sixth team desperately enough that he put up the $25,000 expansion fee himself for the Macon team. With the loss of its two southernmost teams after the first season, the league was based solely in North Carolina and Virginia, until the addition of a Maryland team in 1976.

Teams of the Southern Hockey League listed by founding date.

Seasons
The Southern Hockey League played four seasons. Each season was scheduled with 72 games for each of five to seven teams at the beginning of the season. The Charlotte Checkers appeared in all three Crockett Cup finals, winning two. Regular season and postseason results of the Southern Hockey League:

† First place team on January 31st, when league folded.

WHA/NHL affiliations
Southern Hockey League franchises were primarily affiliated with World Hockey Association teams, however some also had agreements with National Hockey League teams. Summary of WHA/NHL affiliation agreements:

References

External links
 League history and standings

 
Defunct ice hockey leagues in the United States